Bruchbach is a river of North Rhine-Westphalia, Germany. A right tributary of the Hessel, it flows for 8.3 kilometres and has a basin area of 19.139 km2. It flows into the Hessel in Oesterweg.

References

Rivers of North Rhine-Westphalia
Rivers of Germany